Illinois v. Rodriguez, 497 U.S. 177 (1990), is a U.S. Supreme Court case dealing with the issue of whether a warrantless search conducted pursuant to third party consent violates the Fourth Amendment when the third party does not actually possess common authority over the premises.

Opinion of the Court
In an opinion by Justice Scalia and decided 6–3, the Court held that a warrantless search of premises, when a third party consents to the search but does not possess actual common authority over those premises, is valid if the authorities "reasonably believed" at the time of the search that the third party possessed common authority over the premises.

In reaching its decision, the Court noted that "reasonableness," not consent, is the touchstone of Fourth Amendment jurisprudence; the Constitution only prohibits "unreasonable" searches and seizures.  Therefore, the constitutional validity of a police determination of consent to enter is not judged by whether the police were correct in their assessment, but by whether, based on the facts available at the moment, it was reasonable to conclude that the consenting party had authority over the premises.

See also
 United States v. Matlock (1974)
 Georgia v. Randolph (2006)
 List of United States Supreme Court cases, volume 497
 List of United States Supreme Court cases
 Lists of United States Supreme Court cases by volume
 List of United States Supreme Court cases by the Rehnquist Court

Further reading

References

External links

 

United States Supreme Court cases
United States Supreme Court cases of the Rehnquist Court
United States Fourth Amendment case law
1990 in United States case law